Jin Jiang Tower (aka Jinjiang) is a 46-floor tower in Shanghai, China and was completed in 1988. It was built by architects Wong Tung & Partners Limited.

It was the tallest building in Shanghai from its completion in 1988, to the construction of the Oriental Pearl Tower in 1994. It has the largest observatory revolving restaurant in Shanghai.

See also
 Jinjiang Hotel (1934)

References

External links
 

Commercial buildings completed in 1988
1988 establishments in China
Buildings and structures with revolving restaurants
Skyscrapers in Shanghai
Contemporary Chinese architecture
Skyscraper hotels in Shanghai